Malek Tomb is a tower-like, octagonal, probably Ilkhanid tomb located on a hill in the center of Sonqor Town in Kermanshah Province, Iran. The top part is built out of brick; the basement is made of hewn stone.

References
Website of CHHTO of Kermanshah 

Tombs in Iran
Buildings and structures in Kermanshah Province
Mausoleums in Kermanshah Province